Evander Holyfield vs. Alex Stewart, billed as "Undefeated" was a professional boxing match contested on November 4, 1989 for the WBC continental Americas heavyweight title.

Background
Holyfield had dispatched heavyweight contender Adílson Rodrigues in his previous fight in July 1989 to retain both the WBC Continental Americas heavyweight title and his number one ranking in the heavyweight division. For his next fight, Holyfield's team negotiated with a number of heavyweight contenders including George Foreman, Tim Witherspoon, Orlin Norris and Alex Stewart. Holyfield's promoter Dan Duva agreed to give Foreman a $1.5 million purse, but Foreman would not sign the contract at the time as he was also engaged in talks with Don King about a title fight with Mike Tyson. Duva claimed that Foreman only wanted to fight "easy guys", though Foreman stated " I'd like to know about Tyson before I get serious about Holyfield." In August, it was announced that Holyfield would meet Stewart on November 4 instead. Stewart entered the fight with Holyfield with a perfect 24–0 record with all 24 wins coming by way of knockout, though nearly all his opponents were unheralded journeyman. Nevertheless, Stewart was the number two ranked heavyweight by the WBA behind only Holyfield and was earning a $225,000 purse, the largest payday of his career up to that point.

The fight
In what was a tough fight for both competitors, Holyfield would earn an eighth-round technical knockout victory. Holyfield would get the better of Stewart in the fights first four rounds and opened a cut beside Stewart's right eye which would get deeper as the fight went on and hinder Stewart the rest of the fight. Stewart would finally break through, landing a left-right combination that stunned Holyfield. Stewart would continue to land powerful right hands and left hooks before Holyfield began trading punches with Stewart to finish the round. After losing the fifth round, Holyfield would go on the attack in sixth round, landing a series of left hooks that widened the cut on Stewart's eye and caused blood to gush from the wound. Though clearly hurt from the exchange, Stewart would survive the remainder of the round. Though Stewart's corner tried to stop the blood flow between rounds, Stewart continued to bleed profusely. With only nine seconds remaining the eighth round, referee Tony Perez finally halted the action so the ringside physician could examine Stewart's eye, after a brief examination, the physician ordered the fight stopped and Holyfield was announced as the winner by TKO at 2:51 of round eight.

Fight card

References

1989 in boxing
Boxing matches in Atlantic City, New Jersey
Boxing on Showtime
Stewart
November 1989 sports events in the United States